Drug Abuse Resistance Education, or D.A.R.E, is an education program that seeks to prevent use of controlled drugs, membership in gangs, and violent behavior. It was founded in Los Angeles in 1983 as a joint initiative of then-LAPD chief Daryl Gates and the Los Angeles Unified School District as a demand-side drug control strategy of the American War on Drugs. The program's mascot is Daren the Lion.

Its American headquarters is in Inglewood, California. DARE expanded to the United Kingdom in 1995.

History and purpose

DARE program materials from 1991 describe it as "a drug abuse prevention education program designed to equip elementary school children with skills for resisting peer pressure to experiment with tobacco, drugs, and alcohol." It was created as a part of the war on drugs in the United States, with the intention of reducing the demand for drugs through education that would make drug use unappealing. The program was conducted by uniformed police officers who visited classrooms.

The program was developed in 1983 on the initiative of Daryl Gates, chief of the Los Angeles Police Department, in collaboration with Harry Handler, superintendent of the Los Angeles Unified School District. A local program at first, DARE spread rapidly in the 1980s. In 1988, Ronald Reagan proclaimed the first National DARE Day. At the program's height, it was in 75% of American school districts. It was funded by the federal government in the Drug-Free Schools and Communities Act of 1986, which mentions DARE by name. In 2002, DARE had an annual budget of over $10 million.

Curriculum consisted of lectures on the harmful consequences of drug and alcohol use, how to refuse drugs, building self-esteem and support networks, and alternatives to drugs. Curriculum also condemned graffiti and tattoos because they were considered to be the result of peer pressure. These lessons were derived from SMART, an anti-drug program under development at the University of Southern California, but they were adapted to be delivered by police officers instead of educators. Officers were also encouraged to spend time with students informally, such as playing basketball or chatting with students over lunch. Officers would sometimes arrive in sports cars that police had seized from drug dealers, which was intended to demonstrate that drugs lead to losing coveted possessions.

Scientific studies cast doubt on the effectiveness of DARE starting in the early 1990s, with many concluding that DARE did nothing to reduce illicit drug use. One study found that DARE students were actually more likely to use drugs. Yet the program remained popular among politicians and many members of the public for decades, in part because of a common intuitive judgement that the program should work. Funding for DARE was greatly reduced in the 2000s because of its poor performance at reducing drug use, particularly following a General Accounting Office report in 2003 which found "no significant differences in illicit drug use" caused by DARE.

After decades of antagonism toward DARE because of its ineffectiveness, curriculum was changed starting in 2009. The new program is called "Keepin' it REAL" and focuses less on lectures and more on interactive activities, such as practicing refusal and saying no to pressure. It is now less explicitly focused on opposition to drugs, with the broader aim of teaching good decision-making.

Use of children as informants
"Children are asked to submit to DARE police officers sensitive written questionnaires that can easily refer to the kids' homes" and that "a DARE lesson called 'The Three R's: Recognize, Resist, Report' … encourages children to tell friends, teachers or police if they find drugs at home."

In addition, "DARE officers are encouraged to put a 'DARE Box' in every classroom, into which students may drop 'drug information' or questions under the pretense of anonymity. Officers are instructed that if a student 'makes a disclosure related to drug use,' the officer should report the information to further authorities, both school and police. This apparently applies whether the 'drug use' was legal or illegal, harmless or harmful. In a number of communities around the country, students have been enlisted by the DARE officer as informants against their parents."

"In the official DARE Implementation Guide, police officers are advised to be alert for signs of children who have relatives who use drugs. DARE officers are first and foremost police officers and thus are duty-bound to follow up leads that might come to their attention through inadvertent or indiscreet comments by young children." As a result, children sometimes confide the names of people they suspect are illegally using drugs.

Studies on effectiveness

1992 – Indiana University
Researchers at Indiana University, commissioned by Indiana school officials in 1992, found that those who completed the DARE program subsequently had significantly higher rates of hallucinogenic drug use than those not exposed to the program.

1994 – RTI International
In 1994, three RTI International scientists evaluated eight previous quantitative analyses on DARE's efficacy that were found to meet their requirements for rigor. The researchers found that DARE's long-term effect could not be determined, because the corresponding studies were "compromised by severe control group attrition or contamination". However, the study concluded that in the short-term "DARE imparts a large amount of information, but has little or no impact on students' drug use", and that many smaller, interactive programs were more effective.

After the 1994 Research Triangle Institute study, an article in the Los Angeles Times stated that the "organization spent $41,000 to try to prevent widespread distribution of the RTI report and started legal action aimed at squelching the study". The director of publication of the American Journal of Public Health told USA Today that "DARE has tried to interfere with the publication of this. They tried to intimidate us."

1995 – California Department of Education
In 1995, a report to the California Department of Education by Joel Brown, Ph. D., stated that none of California's drug education programs worked, including DARE: "California's drug education programs, DARE being the largest of them, simply doesn't work. More than 40 percent of the students told researchers they were 'not at all' influenced by drug educators or programs. Nearly 70 percent reported neutral to negative feelings about those delivering the antidrug message. While only 10 percent of elementary students responded to drug education negatively or indifferently, this figure grew to 33 percent of middle school students and topped 90 percent at the high school level." In some circles, educators and administrators have admitted that DARE, in fact, potentially increased students' exposure and knowledge of unknown drugs and controlled substances, resulting in experimentation and consumption of narcotics at a much younger age. Criticism focused on failure and misuse of taxpayer dollars, with either ineffective or negative results state-wide.

1998 – National Institute of Justice
In 1998, a grant from the National Institute of Justice to the University of Maryland resulted in a report to the NIJ, which among other statements, concluded that "DARE does not work to reduce substance use." DARE expanded and modified the social competency development area of its curriculum in response to the report. Research by Dr. Dennis Rosenbaum in 1998 found that DARE graduates were more likely than others to drink alcohol, smoke tobacco and use illegal drugs. Psychologist Dr. William Colson asserted in 1998 that DARE increased drug awareness so that "as they get a little older, they (students) become very curious about these drugs they've learned about from police officers." The scientific research evidence in 1998 indicated that the officers were unsuccessful in preventing the increased awareness and curiosity from being translated into illegal use. The evidence suggested that, by exposing young impressionable children to drugs, the program was, in fact, encouraging and nurturing drug use. Studies funded by the National Institute of Justice in 1998, and the California Legislative Analyst's Office in 2000 also concluded that the program was ineffective.

1999 – Lynam et al.
A ten-year study was completed by Donald R. Lynam and colleagues in 2006 involving one thousand DARE graduates in an attempt to measure the effects of the program. After the ten-year period, no measurable effects were noted. The researchers compared levels of alcohol, cigarette, marijuana and the use of illegal substances before the DARE program (when the students were in sixth grade) with the post-DARE levels (when they were 20 years old). Although there were some measured effects shortly after the program on the attitudes of the students towards drug use, these effects did not seem to carry on long term.

2001 – Office of the Surgeon General
In 2001, the Surgeon General of the United States, David Satcher, M.D. Ph.D., placed the DARE program in the category of "Ineffective Primary Prevention Programs". The U.S. General Accounting Office concluded in 2003 that the program was sometimes counterproductive in some populations, with those who graduated from DARE later having higher than average rates of drug use (a boomerang effect).

2007 – Perspectives on Psychological Science
In March 2007, the DARE program was placed on a list of treatments that have the potential to cause harm in clients in the APS journal, Perspectives on Psychological Science.

2009 – Texas A&M

"The Social Construction of 'Evidence-Based' Drug Prevention Programs: A Reanalysis of Data from the Drug Abuse Resistance Education (DARE) Program," Evaluation Review, Vol. 33, No.4, 394–414 (2009). Studies by Dave Gorman and Carol Weiss argue that the DARE program has been held to a higher standard than other youth drug prevention programs. Gorman writes, "what differentiates DARE from many of the programs on evidence-based lists might not be the actual intervention but rather the manner in which data analysis is conducted, reported, and interpreted." Dennis M. Gorman and J. Charles Huber Jr.

The U.S. Department of Education prohibits any of its funding to be used to support drug prevention programs that have not been able to demonstrate their effectiveness. Accordingly, DARE America, in 2004, instituted a major revision of its curriculum.

The U.S. Substance Abuse and Mental Health Services Administration (SAMHSA) identified alternative start-up regional programs, none of which have longevity nor have they been subjected to intense scrutiny.

Reception

The DARE program is consistent with the "zero-tolerance orthodoxy of current U.S. drug control policy." According to researcher Dr. D. M. Gorman of the Rutgers University Center of Alcohol Studies, it supports the ideology and the "prevailing wisdom that exists among policy makers and politicians."

It also claims to meet the needs of stake holders such as school districts, parents, and law enforcement agencies. "DARE America also has been very successful in marketing its program to the news media through a carefully orchestrated public relations campaign that highlights its popularity while downplaying criticism."

Psychologists at the University of Kentucky concluded that "continued enthusiasm [for DARE] shows Americans' stubborn resistance to apply science to drug policy."

Marsha Rosenbaum, who headed the West Coast office of the Lindesmith Center, a drug policy reform organization, provided an opinion for a 1999 Village Voice article, "In DARE's worldview, Marlboro Light cigarettes, Bacardi rum, and a drag from a joint are all equally dangerous. For that matter, so is snorting a few lines of cocaine." DARE "isn't really education. It's indoctrination." The article also stated, "Part of what makes DARE so popular is that participants get lots of freebies. There are fluorescent yellow pens with the DARE logo, tiny DARE dolls, bumper stickers, graduation certificates, DARE banners for school auditoriums, DARE rulers, pennants, DARE coloring books, and T-shirts for all DARE graduates."

DARE has failed to fact check some articles on their website, promoting one news piece that was satire, titled "Edible Marijuana Candies Kill 9 in Colorado, 12 at Coachella."

Responses to criticism

Motivation of the critics 
DARE America has generally dismissed many criticisms and independent studies of its program, labeling them false, misleading, or biased. "DARE has long dismissed criticism of its approach as flawed or the work of groups that favor decriminalization of drug use," according to the New York Times in 2001. In a press release titled "Pro-drug Groups Behind Attack on Prevention Programs; DARE Seen as Target as Mayors' Conference Called to Combat Legalization Threat," DARE asserted that pro-drug legalization individuals and groups were behind criticisms of the program, which were portrayed as based on "vested interests" and "to support various individual personal agendas at the expense of our children."

DARE has attacked critics for allegedly being motivated by their financial self-interest in programs that compete with DARE. It has charged that "they are setting out to find ways to attack our programs and are misusing science to do it. The bottom line is that they don't want police officers to do the work because they want it for themselves." Critics have also been dismissed as being jealous of DARE's success.

Rebuttal of statistics 

Ronald J. Brogan, New York City's DARE fundraiser and spokesman, said in 1999 "If you take German for 17 weeks, you're not going to speak German. The critics say the effect dissipates over the years. No shit, Sherlock." The article in which he was quoted observed that "DARE officials say the solution to this problem is not less DARE but more of it, and they urge cities to teach DARE in middle and high school."

One leader explained that "I don't have any statistics for you. Our strongest numbers are the numbers that don't show up."  The 1998 University of Maryland report presented to the U.S. National Institute of Justice stated, "Officials of DARE America are often quoted as saying that the strong public support for the program is a better indicator of its utility than scientific studies."

New curriculum 

In 2009, DARE adopted the "keepin' it REAL" curriculum. Rather than solely focusing on the perils of alcohol and other drugs, keepin' it REAL developed a 10-lesson curriculum that included aspects of European American, Mexican American, and African American culture integrated with culturally based narration and performance.  The program was developed by Penn State researchers, who evaluated its effectiveness, though critics contend the program does not implement a long-term evaluation system.

In 2013, the Substance Abuse and Mental Health Services Administration ranked its "readiness for dissemination" at 1.5 out of 4. Two field randomized controlled trials showed the effectiveness of the multicultural keepin' it REAL for reducing substance use across grade levels and ethnic/racial groups, which highlights the importance of grounding substance use prevention programs in their audiences' cultural attitudes, values, norms, and beliefs. The second study "evaluated onset of drug use across and within ethnic groups and the ideal times to intervene" finding "a double dose of intervention in elementary and middle school was no more effective than middle school intervention alone."

Following the passing of Washington Initiative 502 that legalized cannabis consumption in Washington state, the DARE program was changed in the state to remove cannabis messages from their year 5 curriculum, arguing "research has found that teaching children about drugs with which they have never heard of or have no real life understanding may stimulate their interest or curiosity about the substance."

Ironic response

T-shirts and other merchandise reading "D.A.R.E To Keep Kids Off Drugs" became popular as an ironic item in drug culture and other countercultures starting in the 1990s. According to a report from Vice, the program's appealing logo and acronym may unintentionally suggest one should dare to experiment with drugs. Reddit co-founder Alexis Ohanian in a 2022 tweet referred to his sporting of the T-Shirt in 2019 with "What are you all wearing for Halloween this year?"

References

External links 

 
 DARE World
 How to Start a DARE Program in your Community
 International Association of Chiefs of Police, IACP 
 2003 U.S. General Accounting Office letter to Senator Richard J. Durbin
 UK website
 Training Center Minas Gerais / DARE Brazil (PROERD)
 DARE Brazil (PROERD)
 Official Keepin' It Real website
 Alamo Area / Bexar County DARE
 ASU's official Keepin' it REAL website
 Drug Abuse Helpline

Health education in the United States
Law enforcement in the United States
American companies established in 1983
Drug rehabilitation
History of drug control
Law enforcement in England and Wales
1983 establishments in California